Mary Malcolmson (A.H. Malcolmson) started the first Girl Guide company in Canada on 1910-01-11 in St. Catharines, Ontario.

1st St. Catharines
Malcolmson organized the first Canadian Girl Guide company to be officially registered. The Company started to meet in November 1909 in St. Catharines, Ontario and was registered on 1910-01-11. Meetings were held in the Welland House Hotel. Pamphlet A: Baden-Powell Girl Guides, a Suggestion for Character Training for Girls and Pamphlet B: Baden-Powell Girl Guides, a Suggestion for Character Training for Girls had been sent to a Scout leader in St. Catharines and he passed them on to Malcolmson.

St. Catharines Council of Women

St. Catharines Council of Women was founded in 1918. Malcolmson was elected as its first president. The goals of the St. Catharines Council of Women were to improve the conditions of families, community, and the Canadian state.

Malcolmson Park

A park in St. Catharines was named for Malcolmson. It is bounded to the east by the Welland Canal, to the west by Port Weller, to the north by Lake Ontario and to the south, by Lakeshore Road.

See also

 Girl Guides of Canada
 Mary Pellatt

References

External links
 The registration certificate of the first St Catherines Ontario Guide Company

Girl Guiding and Girl Scouting
Scouting and Guiding in Canada
Scouting pioneers